Mago is a genus of Ecuadorian jumping spiders that was first described by Octavius Pickard-Cambridge in 1882.  it contains only two species, found only in Ecuador: M. brimodes and M. intentus.

References

Salticidae genera
Salticidae
Spiders of South America
Taxa named by Octavius Pickard-Cambridge